William Stewart (1861 – 14 December 1955) was a politician of the Reform Party (New Zealand).

He was then appointed to the New Zealand Legislative Council for two terms, from 1918 to 1925 and 1925 to 1932.

In 1935, he was awarded the King George V Silver Jubilee Medal.

Notes

References

1861 births
1955 deaths
Reform Party (New Zealand) MPs
Members of the New Zealand House of Representatives
Members of the New Zealand Legislative Council
Reform Party (New Zealand) MLCs
New Zealand MPs for North Island electorates